Eylove is a surname. Notable people with the surname include:

 Roger Eylove (disambiguation), several people
 Thomas Eylove, MP for Bletchingley (UK Parliament constituency)